DC10 is a nightclub located in Ibiza on the Carretera of Salinas. It started during the 90s as a music bar and began with a license for just 80 people, opened by two Spanish brothers, Deogracias lara Moreno and Antonio Lara Moreno. In 1999, Italian promoters Antonio Carbonaro and Andrea Pelino joined in force, becoming partner at DC10, and creating the Circoloco brand, which would soon become the Monday event during each Ibiza season.

In 2020, the nightclub was voted 19th on the "Top 100 Clubs" list by the readers of DJ Magazine.

History and Description

DC10 venue 
Over the years, the venue, which had started with the licence for a music bar, grew to an event hall with a capacity of 1,500 people. The nightclub is divided into three rooms, La Terrace, The Main Room and The Open Air Garden, each of which is dedicated to a different genre of music. DC10 is open two to three nights a week.

Circoloco event 

The Circoloco event at DC-10 initially began as a free after-party on Monday mornings, starting at 6am and going on until 6 pm.

In contrast to other nightclubs on the Ibiza island, Circoloco still does little or no publicity for its parties. International DJs who played at Circoloco include Luciano, Loco Dice, Ricardo Villalobos, Seth Troxler, The Martinez Brothers, Damian Lazarus, Jamie Jones, Peggy Gou, Black Coffee, Tale Of Us, &ME, and Amelie Lens.

In 2019, DC10 announced it would ban single-use plastic from the event and offer recyclable water bottles instead.

Since 1999 Circoloco proposed every year to its crowd the slogan of their season, which is like the motto of the summer. Starting in 1999 with "Ibiza Monday Session" to "Sorry We Are Circoloco" was a succession of statements year after year. 

In addition to its events at the DC10 nightclub, the Circoloco brand has held events worldwide in cities such as New York, Miami, London, Milan, Paris, Amsterdam, Tel Aviv, Istanbul, Rio de Janeiro, Buenos Aires, Bogotà, Tokyo, Kuala Lumpur, Phuket, Sydney and Melbourne.

In 2018, fashion designer Virgil Abloh dedicated a capsule collection to the Circoloco event.

Noise restrictions
In October 2017, Diario de Ibiza reported DC10 being charged by local police for exceeding noise restrictions for their closing party.

See also

List of electronic dance music venues
Superclub

References

External links

DC10 on Facebook
DC10 on Resident Advisor

Club nights
ParadiseParadise.com
Paradise on Facebook
Circoloco on Facebook 

Nightclubs in Ibiza
Music venues completed in 2000
2000 establishments in Spain
Electronic dance music venues